HD 189245 is the Henry Draper catalogue designation for a solitary star in the southern constellation of Sagittarius. It has an apparent visual magnitude of 5.66, which means it is faintly visible to the naked eye. Parallax measurements from the Hipparcos satellite indicate a distance of 72 light years from the Sun. It is drifting closer with a heliocentric radial velocity of −13 km/s.

It is a variable star with an active chromosphere and is a source of X-ray emission. HD 189245 is spinning rapidly with a projected rotational velocity of 72.6 km/s. Gyrochronology indicates this is a young star with an estimated age of 500 million years. However, the amount of X-ray emission suggests an even younger star that is roughly 100 million years old.

The velocity components of HD 189245 indicate that it is a likely member of the AB Doradus moving group of stars, which share a common motion through space. This group has an age of around 50 million years and is centered at a point  from the Sun.

References 

F-type main-sequence stars
Suspected variables

Sagittarius (constellation)
Gould objects
Durchmusterung objects
7631
Gliese and GJ objects
189245
098470